Pseudomonas sRNA P11 is a ncRNA that was predicted using bioinformatic tools in the genome of the opportunistic pathogen Pseudomonas aeruginosa and its expression verified by northern blot analysis. P11 is located between a putative threonine protein kinase and putative nitrate reductase and is conserved in several Pseudomonas species.  P11 has a predicted Rho independent terminator at the 3′ end but the function of P11 is unknown.

See also

Pseudomonas sRNA P1
Pseudomonas sRNA P9
Pseudomonas sRNA P15
Pseudomonas sRNA P16
Pseudomonas sRNA P24
Pseudomonas sRNA P26

References

External links
 

Non-coding RNA